The Saldanha catshark (Apristurus saldanha) is a species of catshark, belonging to the family Scyliorhinidae. This catshark is found from Cape Columbine to south of False Bay in South Africa, between 31 and 40°S. Its length is up to 88 cm. It is a plain, dark grey-brown, stout catshark, with moderately large eyes, a broad snout, and large pectoral fins.

References

Compagno, L.J.V., 1984. FAO Species Catalogue. Vol. 4. Sharks of the world. An annotated and illustrated catalogue of shark species known to date. Part 2 - Carcharhiniformes. FAO Fish. Synop. 125(4/2):251-655. Rome: FAO.

Saldanha catshark
Marine fish of South Africa
Endemic fauna of South Africa
Taxa named by Keppel Harcourt Barnard
Saldanha catshark